Sonic the Hedgehog 2 is a 2022 action-adventure comedy film based on the video game series published by Sega, and the sequel to Sonic the Hedgehog (2020). Directed by Jeff Fowler and written by Pat Casey, Josh Miller, and John Whittington, the film stars Ben Schwartz,  Jim Carrey, James Marsden, Tika Sumpter, Natasha Rothwell, Adam Pally, Lee Majdoub, and Colleen O'Shaughnessey reprising their roles, with Idris Elba and Shemar Moore joining the cast. In the film, after settling in Green Hills, Sonic tries to prove himself as a hero, but his big test comes when the evil Doctor Robotnik returns, alongside his new rival, Knuckles the Echidna, in search of the Master Emerald.

Following the success of the first film, Paramount Pictures announced the sequel in May 2020, with Fowler returning as director, Casey and Josh Miller returning as writers, and Schwartz, Carrey, and the rest of the cast reprised their roles. Filming took place from March to June 2021 in Vancouver and Hawaii.

Sonic the Hedgehog 2 was theatrically released in several markets on March 30, 2022, and in the United States on April 8, by Paramount Pictures and Sega Sammy Group. The film received positive reviews from critics like its predecessor, who praised its action sequences, humor, and performances, but criticized its screenplay, runtime, and pacing. Many critics considered the film an improvement over its predecessor. It grossed over $405 million worldwide, becoming the highest-grossing video game film in the United States and the fourth highest-grossing video game film of all time. A third film is scheduled for a December 20, 2024 release, while a spin-off miniseries starring Knuckles is in development and is scheduled to be released in 2023.

Plot
Roughly eight months after defeating Dr. Robotnik, Sonic attempts to help the public as a vigilante hero with little success. Tom advises Sonic to remain patient for the day his powers will be needed before he and Maddie depart for Rachel's wedding in Hawaii.

Sonic plans to have fun while home alone but is attacked by Robotnik, who has escaped the mushroom planet with the help of a powerful anthropomorphic echidna named Knuckles. To honor his ancestors, Knuckles demands the location of the legendary Master Emerald, an ancient relic that grants its user immense power and the ability to change reality to their will.

Sonic is rescued by Miles "Tails" Prower, an anthropomorphic two-tailed fox who idolizes him and comes to warn him about Knuckles. Sonic convinces Tails to help him find the Master Emerald, while Robotnik reunites with his assistant Stone and, scheming to steal the emerald, offers to help Knuckles. Sonic and Tails follow clues to a Siberian cave on a map Longclaw gave Sonic before sending him to Earth, where they find a compass within a temple. Robotnik and Knuckles track them and chase Sonic and Tails down a mountain. Knuckles reveals that he lost his father and his whole tribe the same day Sonic lost Longclaw. Despite this brief moment of sympathy, Knuckles and Robotnik steal the compass, though Knuckles begins to question Robotnik's sense of loyalty and honor when he mocks Sonic for choosing to save a wounded Tails instead of the compass.

Tom saves Sonic and Tails by using a ring to teleport them to the wedding. Rachel's fiancé Randall and his wedding guests reveal themselves as undercover agents of the Guardian Units of Nations and arrest Sonic, Tails, and Tom, who are then saved by Maddie and a vengeful Rachel, who reconciles with Randall. Meanwhile, Robotnik and Knuckles find an underwater temple containing the Master Emerald.

Blaming himself for Tails's injuries, Sonic decides to face Robotnik and Knuckles alone and goes to the temple, where he fights with Knuckles to keep him from taking the Master Emerald. Seeing this as an opportunity, Robotnik uses the distraction to seize and fuse himself with the emerald, which explodes and sinks the temple into the water. With no use left for Knuckles, Robotnik betrays him and leaves him along with Sonic behind for dead. Working together, Sonic and Knuckles are able to escape just as Tails rescues them in a biplane. In Green Hills, Robotnik uses his new abilities to create a giant robot resembling himself. Sonic, Tails, and Knuckles work together to fight the robot and its accompanying drones and to reclaim the Master Emerald; however, it breaks, splitting into the seven Chaos Emeralds. Tom and Maddie save Sonic, who uses the Chaos Emeralds to transform into Super Sonic. He destroys the robot before dispersing the Emeralds and reverting to normal. In the aftermath, Robotnik is presumed dead and Knuckles fixes the Master Emerald from the remaining shards, before making a pact to protect it from evil with Sonic and Tails, and they start an idyllic life with the Wachowskis.

Cast

Voice cast
 Ben Schwartz as Sonic the Hedgehog:An anthropomorphic blue hedgehog who can run at supersonic speeds, but cannot swim. He wants to use his powers to help others but is brash and irresponsible. Upon learning of his arch-nemesis Dr. Robotnik's return and his search for the mythical Master Emerald, Sonic resolves to stop him by teaming up with his new friend Tails, maturing into the hero he aspires to be.
 Archival footage and recordings of Benjamin L. Valic as young Sonic are used during some flashbacks.
 Colleen O'Shaughnessey as Miles "Tails" Prower: An anthropomorphic yellow-orange fox who can fly with his two tails. Tails is a humble genius who invents gadgets for locations and fighting. After finding inspiration in Sonic's bravery against Robotnik, he leaves his home planet for Earth to warn Sonic that Knuckles is hunting him and quickly becomes his friend. O'Shaughnessey is the only voice cast member from the Sonic the Hedgehog games to reprise her role for the film.
 Idris Elba as Knuckles the Echidna: An anthropomorphic red echidna warrior with super strength. He is serious, aggressive, and quick-tempered, but has a strong sense of honor. He is the sole survivor of the echidna tribe after they were wiped out by the owl tribe and initially works with Robotnik to retrieve the Master Emerald. However, after Robotnik dishonors their deal and betrays him, Knuckles befriends Sonic and Tails, and aids them in defeating Robotnik. Elba prepared for the role by exploring the character's backstory and identity. Director Jeff Fowler wanted the film's portrayal of Knuckles to be reminiscent of his early appearances, and said "his entire existence is about honor and about being a warrior", describing him as "a force of nature".
 Donna J. Fulks as Longclaw: An anthropomorphic brown owl, Sonic's late mentor/caregiver and the former guardian of the Master Emerald who is seen in flashbacks and in a holographic message hidden in Sonic's map.

Live-action cast
 Jim Carrey as Doctor Robotnik / Eggman, a mad scientist and Sonic's arch-nemesis who he often refers to as "Eggman". After escaping from the mushroom planet, Robotnik teams up with Knuckles to retaliate against Sonic and find the Master Emerald.
 James Marsden as Tom Wachowski / Donutlord, the sheriff of Green Hills, Montana and Sonic's father figure. He goes away to Hawaii with his wife to celebrate Rachel's marriage, leaving Sonic alone in his house.
 Tika Sumpter as Maddie Wachowski, Tom's wife and the local veterinarian of Green Hills who is Sonic's mother figure. She goes to Hawaii with Tom to celebrate her sister's wedding.
 Natasha Rothwell as Rachel, Maddie's older sister who has an extreme dislike of Tom yet attempts to make up with him for the sake of her wedding to Randall.
 Adam Pally as Wade Whipple, the deputy sheriff of Green Hills and Tom's friend. He becomes the acting sheriff of Green Hills with Tom away. 
 Shemar Moore as Randall Handel, Rachel's fiancé who is a Guardian Units of Nations agent and is set to become Jojo's step-father.
 Lee Majdoub as Agent Stone, an ex-government agent and Robotnik's assistant.
 Tom Butler as Commander Walters, the Vice Chairman of the Joint Chiefs of Staff who is now the owner and leader of the military organization Guardian Units of Nations (G.U.N.)
 Melody Nosipho Niemann as Jojo, Rachel's daughter and Tom and Maddie's niece who is set to become Randall's step-daughter.

Production

Development
In April 2020, Marsden had expressed interest in a sequel featuring several characters from the video games, including Tails, who appeared in a mid-credits scene in the first film. Director Jeff Fowler also expressed interest in developing a sequel that focused on Sonic and Tails' friendship and further developed Dr. Robotnik. Later that month, Schwartz said that he felt it made sense for Paramount Pictures not to have announced a sequel by that point due to the COVID-19 pandemic, also adding that he was interested in a sequel featuring Tails and a more game-accurate portrayal of Robotnik.

In May, Paramount Pictures confirmed that a sequel to Sonic the Hedgehog was in development, with Fowler set to return as director alongside writers Casey and Josh Miller. Neal H. Mortiz, Toby Ascher, and Toru Nakahara will produce the sequel, having previously co-produced the first film alongside Takeshi Ito, while Tim Miller, Hajime Satomi, and Haruki Satomi will return from the first film as executive producers.

In December, it was confirmed by storyboard artist Fill Marc that artist Tyson Hesse, who redesigned Sonic for the first film, would be returning. The film title was announced as Sonic the Hedgehog 2 in February 2021. In May, a synopsis of the story was released as Paramount submitted a copyright registration to the U.S. Copyright Office catalog.

The film is inspired by the video games Sonic the Hedgehog 2 (1992) and Sonic the Hedgehog 3 (1994), but is not a direct adaptation of either. Fowler described the film as "a melting pot" of ideas from several Sonic games.

Casting
On January 27, 2020, Jim Carrey expressed interest in starring in a sequel, feeling that his character, the villain Dr. Robotnik, could be expanded in the sequel: "I wouldn't mind going to do another one because it was so much fun, first of all, and a real challenge to try to convince people that I have a triple-digit IQ... There is so much room, you know, Robotnik has not reached his apotheosis." On March 6, 2020, Sonic the Hedgehog star James Marsden confirmed that he had signed on for multiple sequels.

On January 26, 2021, Tika Sumpter announced that she would reprise her role as Maddie Wachowski. In February 2021, it was reported that Jason Momoa was in talks for the role of Knuckles the Echidna. In March 2021, it was announced that Ben Schwartz and Jim Carrey would reprise their roles as Sonic and Robotnik respectively. That same month, it was confirmed that Adam Pally would reprise his role as Wade Whipple. In April 2021, James Marsden was confirmed to return as Tom Wachowski. On June 16, 2021, it was announced that Shemar Moore had joined the cast in an undisclosed role, it was later confirmed that he would play Randall, Rachel's fiancé. On August 10, 2021, it was announced that Idris Elba had officially joined the cast as the voice of Knuckles the Echidna. That same month, it was confirmed that Natasha Rothwell would reprise her role as Rachel. On September 29, 2021, it was announced that Lee Majdoub would reprise his role as Agent Stone. On December 7, 2021, Colleen O'Shaughnessey announced she would return to voice Miles "Tails" Prower.

For the film's Japanese dub, Hololive Production-affiliated VTuber, Inugami Korone, who also serves as the Japanese brand ambassador of the Sonic series, would be cast to voice a character in the film.

Filming
In December 2020, it was reported that the BC Film Commission had listed that the production of the film would occur from March 15 to May 10, 2021, under the working title Emerald Hill, a reference to the opening zone in the Sonic the Hedgehog 2 video game. In January 2021, Tika Sumpter revealed that the film would shoot in both Vancouver and Hawaii.

Principal photography began in Vancouver on March 15, 2021, with Brandon Trost serving as cinematographer. As a way to show his gratitude to the crew, Carrey held a raffle on May 7 in order to give away a Chevrolet Blazer; the car was eventually given to a grip. Filming in Vancouver concluded on May 12, 2021. Filming wrapped in Hawaii on June 25, 2021.

Visual effects and animation
Visual effects and animation for Sonic the Hedgehog 2 was provided by Sega's Marza Animation Planet and Moving Picture Company, after previously working on the first film. John Whittington was announced as co-screenwriter on August 10, 2021. Additionally, DNEG also provided the visual effects for the mushroom planet and the cockpit of the robot, giving it a total of 185 shots used in the film from the studio.

Music

On December 8, 2021, Tom Holkenborg, who also composed the first film, was announced to be returning to compose the film's score. The film was supported by a single titled "Stars in the Sky", the only original song recorded for the film, by Kid Cudi. The soundtrack album was released by Paramount Music on April 8, 2022.

On April 7, 2022, it was announced that "Up on the Green Hill from Sonic the Hedgehog Green Hill Zone - Masado and Miwasco Version -" by Dreams Come True would be used as the main theme song for the film's release in Japan. The song is the English version of the band's 2021 single "Tsugi no Se~no! De - On the Green Hill -," which is a vocal version of the theme music of Green Hill Zone from the original game. The Japanese version of the song is also used as the dub's ending theme. Band member Masato Nakamura, who composed the music for the series' first two games, also voices a character in the Japanese dub.

Release

Marketing
The teaser poster was revealed on December 8, 2021. The next day, the first trailer was released at The Game Awards 2021. The trailer includes a reworked version of Masato Nakamura's "Emerald Hill Zone" music from the original Sonic the Hedgehog 2 video game. Fans reacted very positively, with Elba as Knuckles attracting particular praise. Reviewers noted the difference in reaction compared to the first film's initial trailer that was released on April 30, 2019.

During the week before Super Bowl LVI, Paramount released four TV spots showcasing new footage and the reveal of the Giant Eggman Robot. A special TV spot aired during Super Bowl LVI on February 13, 2022. The theatrical release poster excluded O'Shaughnessey's name, leading to fan outcry. Updated posters, released shortly thereafter, included her name as well as Sumpter's on the upper billing block. The second and final trailer was released on March 14, 2022. Another poster was also revealed, resembling the North American boxart for the original Sonic the Hedgehog 2 video game.

Paramount spent less than $18 million on television spots promoting the film in the U.S., which generated 717 million impressions. On March 29, 2022, King partnered with Sega and Paramount to help create a special edition of the online game Candy Crush Saga in ways to promote the film. The Mill helped do the visuals for the Happy Meal advertisements.

Theatrical
On March 1, 2022, Paramount cancelled the film's Russian release in response to the Russian invasion of Ukraine. On March 14, when tickets went on sale for the United States, an early access screening dubbed a "Fan Event" was announced for April 6.

Sonic the Hedgehog 2 was first theatrically released by Paramount Pictures in several international markets, including France, Philippines and the Netherlands on March 30, 2022 and the United Kingdom on April 1, 2022. The film held its world premiere at the Regency Village Theatre in Los Angeles on April 5, 2022. and was theatrically released in the United States on April 8, 2022.

Home media
Sonic the Hedgehog 2 was released for download and streaming on Paramount+ on May 24, 2022. The same day, EPIX added the film to their library following Paramount's pay-one-window deal with the service. It released on DVD, Blu-ray, and Ultra HD Blu-ray on August 9, 2022. Like its predecessor, the digital and Blu-ray releases come with an exclusive short film, Sonic Drone Home, fully animated by Marza Animation Planet and written by Pat Casey and Josh Miller, while directed by David Nelson and produced by Neal H. Moritz, Toby Ascher, Toru Nakahara and Hitoshi Okuno. The short film features Sonic, Tails, and Knuckles facing off against one of Robotnik's drones in Green Hills' scrapyard. Schwartz reprises his role as Sonic, while Tails, Knuckles, and the drone named Unit are voiced by Alicyn Packard (replacing Colleen), Fred Tatasciore (replacing Idris), and Aaron Landon respectively.

Reception

Box office
Sonic the Hedgehog 2 grossed $190.9 million in the United States and Canada, and $214.5 million in other territories, for a worldwide total of $405.4 million.

In the United States and Canada, Sonic the Hedgehog 2 was released alongside Ambulance and the wide expansion of Everything Everywhere All at Once. Several days before release, it was projected to gross at least $55 million from 4,232 theaters in its opening weekend. With its target audience aged between 16 and 25, its release coincided with the start of spring break in 15% of K–12 schools. The film made $26.8 million on its first day, including $6.25 million from Thursday night previews, doubling that of the original movie. The film went on to gross  over its three-day opening weekend, surpassing the original film's three-day opening ($58 million) and Bruce Almighty to become Jim Carrey's highest three-day domestic opening and Paramount's biggest three-day opening since 2014.  tickets were sold in the U.S. and Canada during its opening weekend. It broke the opening record for a video game movie adaptation, which was previously held by the original Sonic the Hedgehog. Among opening audiences, males made up 61%, those aged between 18 and 34 comprised 46% of ticket sales and those below 17 comprised 32%, and the ethnic breakdown was 38% were Hispanic/Latin American, 29% Caucasian, 20% African American, and 13% Asian or other. The film also had the best pandemic-era opening for a kids' movie, the all-time seventh best April opening, the second best opening of early 2022, and the fifth best opening since 2020. In its second weekend, the film made $29.3 million, finishing second behind Fantastic Beasts: The Secrets of Dumbledore. By its third weekend, the film surpassed the original Sonic the Hedgehog to become the highest-grossing video game film in North America. The film remained in the box office top ten until dropping out in its twelfth weekend. Sonic the Hedgehog 2 ended up being the ninth highest-grossing film of 2022 in the U.S and Canada.

In international regions outside North America, the film opened in 31 markets and grossed $26.1 million in its first weekend, outpacing the original film in these markets. In France, the film made $1.2 million on its first day of screening, reaching the top spot in the charts and surpassing the first film's opening day gross by 30%. The film crossed the $300 million worldwide mark by its fifth weekend, and the $400 million threshold by its thirteenth.

Critical response
The review aggregator Rotten Tomatoes reported an approval rating of 69% based on 175 reviews, with an average rating of 5.9/10. The site's critical consensus reads, "It isn't as much fun as the little blue guy's greatest games, but if you enjoyed the first film, Sonic the Hedgehog 2 serves as a generally acceptable sequel." Metacritic assigned the film a weighted average score of 47 out of 100 based on 33 critics, indicating "mixed or average reviews". Audiences polled by CinemaScore gave the film an average grade of "A" on an A+ to F scale (same as the first), while those at PostTrak gave it an 87% positive score, with 74% saying they would definitely recommend it.

Amy Nicholson of The New York Times gave the film a positive review, saying, "Jim Carrey's reprised role as a villainous weirdo helps this fast-paced, family-friendly video-game-movie sequel maintain a refreshing silliness." Nell Minow of Rogerebert.com gave the film a two out of four, writing, "Yes, we know we're appropriating details from better movies. It is over-plotted, with three different storylines mixing comedy and adventure." Alex Stednan of IGN gave the film a seven out of ten, saying, "Sonic the Hedgehog 2 brings all the humor and charm of its predecessor, while also being delightfully more loyal to its source material." Carlos Aguilar of The Wrap also gave the film a positive review, writing, "The screenplay reflects actual effort, and Jim Carrey gets to be unfettered in his performance, leading a surprisingly satisfying follow-up." Leslie Felperin of The Guardian gave the film a three out of four and wrote, "There's not much to spoil about Sonic the Hedgehog 2 because there's not very much to say about it, other than it's mildly amusing and reasonably competently assembled." Brian
Shea of Game Informer gave the film a 8.5 out of 10, writing, "While Sonic the Hedgehog's unexpected positive reception could have put its sequel in a difficult spot since it comes in with higher expectations, the Jeff Fowler-directed Sonic the Hedgehog 2 clears the higher bar, delivering a better movie in nearly every way." In a "C+" review, Ross Bonamie of Collider wrote, " Sonic the Hedgehog 2 is at its most clever when it's throwing in these clever nods that will appeal to fans who have waited to see this world come to life on the screen in this way with these characters."

John Nugent of Empire Magazine gave the film a two out of five, writing, "Sonic's second outing is little more than a half-baked half-term distraction tool — though Jim Carrey's outrageously committed performance nearly saves the day." Brian Lloyd of Entertainment.ie gave the film a three out of five and said, "Idris Elba as Knuckles is the most galaxy-brain casting idea ever conceived of." Bob Hoose of Plugged In gave the film a positive review, saying, "In short, Sonic the Hedgehog 2 doesn't necessarily grab the gold ring right out the first loop-de-loop, but it won't disappoint the kids or their "fanboy" parents by the time you hit the flag-waving goal." Thomas Floyd of The Washington Post gave the film a two out of four and wrote, "In Sonic the Hedgehog 2, there is no problem that its titular speed demon can't outrun. With that in mind, it's especially perplexing that this video game-inspired sequel should be, of all things, a bit sluggish." In a "C-" review, Siddhant Adlakha of IndieWire wrote, "It's visual soup where nothing pops or stands out. Almost nothing anyone does or says feels rooted in recognizable character traits, and despite Marsden's most sincere efforts, he finds himself once again unable to meet Sonic's eye-line (a production kerfuffle that would be funny, were it not also another reminder of VFX crunch). Then again, who can blame Marsden's character for not wanting to gaze into a soulless blue abyss?"

Accolades

Future

In February 2022, Sega of America and Paramount Pictures confirmed that Sonic the Hedgehog 3 and a Knuckles spin-off miniseries are in development. Elba will reprise his role as Knuckles for the series, which is set for release on the streaming service Paramount+ in 2023. Sonic the Hedgehog 3 is scheduled for release on December 20, 2024. Schwartz will reprise his role as Sonic, while Casey, Miller and Whittington will return to write the script.

In April 2022, after Carrey announced that he was considering retirement from acting, producers Moritz and Ascher confirmed that his role as Dr. Robotnik would not be recast in any sequels if he followed through with his retirement plans, though they remained hopeful that they could develop a script good enough for him to continue the role.

See also
 List of films based on video games

Notes

References

External links

 
 
 
 

2022 action adventure films
2020s animated superhero films
2020s English-language films
2020s fantasy adventure films
2020s superhero films
2022 computer-animated films
2022 science fiction action films
2020s American animated films
4DX films
American action adventure films
American action comedy films
American adventure comedy films
American animated superhero films
American computer-animated films
American fantasy action films
American fantasy adventure films
American fantasy comedy films
American robot films
American science fantasy films
American science fiction action films
American science fiction adventure films
American science fiction comedy films
American sequel films
Blur Studio films
English-language Japanese films
Films about extraterrestrial life
Films about foxes
Films directed by Jeff Fowler
Films impacted by the COVID-19 pandemic
Films scored by Junkie XL
Films set in Hawaii
Films set in Montana
Films set in Seattle
Films set in Siberia
Films set on fictional planets
Films shot in Hawaii
Films shot in Vancouver
Films using motion capture
American films with live action and animation
Films with screenplays by John Whittington (screenwriter)
Japanese action adventure films
Japanese action comedy films
Japanese adventure comedy films
Japanese animated superhero films
Japanese computer-animated films
Japanese fantasy action films
Japanese fantasy adventure films
Japanese fantasy comedy films
Japanese robot films
Japanese science fantasy films
Japanese science fiction action films
Japanese science fiction adventure films
Japanese science fiction comedy films
Japanese sequel films
Live-action films based on video games
Mad scientist films
Original Film films
Paramount Pictures animated films
Paramount Pictures films
Sonic the Hedgehog films